Brooks Field is a stadium located on the campus of the University of North Carolina Wilmington in Wilmington, North Carolina. Brooks Field is the home of the UNC Wilmington Seahawks baseball team and has hosted the Colonial Athletic Association baseball tournament a number of times (1989–90, 1993, 2004–11, 2014, 2017). The ballpark has a capacity of 3,500 people and first opened in 1989. In 2014 UNCW broke the 2009 record attendance of 3,608 (vs North Carolina) with 3,826 people (vs. #1 Virginia).

Name
The stadium is named after former UNCW coach and athletic director Bill Brooks. He started the athletic program when UNCW was a junior college and served past the school becoming a Division I program and joining the Colonial Athletic Association. Brooks served 40 years at the school, 27 as the baseball coach, with a career win–loss record of 574–292–5. His name, with the number 574, is on the wall in left field at Brooks Field.

Stadium design and features
Brooks Field is a symmetric park where it is 340 feet from home plate to the foul poles and is 380 feet to deep center field. Seating consists of a main set of seats that extends from roughly the third base line to the first base line. There are two sets of bleachers on each side of the main seating area. There is also a berm located behind the left field fence, which fans can also sit at. The stadium has one concession stand and a small team store behind the away dugout. A simple electronic scoreboard sits in right-center field.

Minor league history
The ballpark was home to the Southern League's Class AA Port City Roosters in 1995 and 1996 and the South Atlantic League's Class A Wilmington Waves in 2001.

See also
 List of NCAA Division I baseball venues

References

Sports venues in Wilmington, North Carolina
Minor league baseball venues
Baseball venues in North Carolina
UNC Wilmington Seahawks baseball
1989 establishments in North Carolina
Sports venues completed in 1989